Gamasot, or simply sot, is a big, heavy pot or cauldron used for Korean cooking.

Origin 
The origins of the ‘sot’ originate in the "Chung" which is made of bronze. Researchers have speculated that copper would be easier to handle because it has a lower melting point than steel. Bronze ‘sot’ are frequently unearthed as remains of the Three Kingdoms period, because the meaning of 'Chung' was symbolic of the nation, the throne, and the industry. However, the history of iron ‘sot’ goes up to the Bronze Age much earlier than the Three Kingdoms period . The copper ‘sot’ on the Korean Peninsula were first discovered in the remains of Gojoson, which belongs to the late Bronze Age Korean copper sword culture period. A large amount of ‘sot’ is excavated from the ruins of the 'Hansa-gun' which was installed as the Gojoseon was destroyed by Han in 108 BC. In particular, the remains of ‘Nakrang-gun’ are famous for the largest number of pots among the four groups.

Shape 
It was very large and recessed to fit the large family of Korea. In general, gama mean utensils when lighting a fire, and sot means pot and bowl that cook rice. The gamasot has no legs and the bottom of the pot is round and usually has a small recess at the edge of the entrance. There are four projections on the body, which is convenient to put across the stove. The lid is made of iron, and it has a convenient tap in the middle.

History 
From ancient times, the pot was not simply a device for cooking food, but a symbol of kingship, power, state, and industry. It was used as a tool to record the achievements of public figures or to punish corrupt officials, religious ceremonies, or food for the dead. 

Cooking rice in gamasot is a longstanding custom in Korea, that began at least during the reign of King Daemusin (18‒44 CE) in Goguryeo.

Usage 
In the hanok's kitchen, agungi can be used for heating and cooking, and gamasot is a large pot designed for use as a cooking utensil. Gamasot is very large, so it is common to use it almost fixed to agungi. Gamasot is a Korean traditional pot that has kept its kitchen for a long time. There were few places where it is not used, such as making fire, cooking rice, frying the side dishes and steaming. The closest thing to real life was gamasot. It is an important cooking tool that can not be used for cooking in Korea. Therefore, the pot was a history of the family.

Gallery

See also

Extra-large Gamasot 

In July 2005, Goesan-gun, Chungcheongbuk-do completed an extra-large gamasot with over 500 million won in military budget and resident's contribution. The super-sized gamasot is 17.85 meters in circumference, 2.2 meters in height, 5.88 meters in diameter, and weighs 43.5 tons. This gamasot is located in Goesan-eup Dongbu Clean Chilli Distribution Center. In the pot lid there are inscriptions of ascending dragons, turtles and Mugunghwa. It is said that Goesan-gun could build 40,000 people of rice at a time, but he could not do it, and he only stewed 10,000 corns. Goesan-gun applied for the Guinness Book of World Records as the world's largest cauldron, but abandoned the promotion of the Guinness Book by the fact that the earthenware of Australia was bigger. Also, Goesan - gun has not used this super - sized cauldron since 2007 and has neglected it. So, Goesan - gun tried to find out how to utilize the super - sized cauldron with various meanings of the people, and finally decided to leave it for publicity.

 Dolsot
 List of cooking vessels

References 

Cauldrons
Korean food preparation utensils
Containers